The Ashkenazi Synagogue is an Ashkenazi synagogue located near the Galata Tower in Karaköy neighborhood of Beyoğlu in Istanbul, Turkey. It is the only currently active Ashkenazi synagogue in Istanbul open to visits and prayers. The synagogue was founded by Jews of Austrian origin in 1900.  It is also the last remaining synagogue from a total of three built by Ashkenazim, as the population of Ashkenazi Jews accounts for 4 percent of the total Jewish population of Turkey. Visits to the synagogue can be made during weekday mornings and for Shabbat services on Saturday mornings.

The synagogue holds weddings, bar mitzvahs and other religious ceremonies in the Ashkenazi tradition.

Rabbi Dr. David Marcus, who also established the Jewish school Bene Berit, served as Rabbi and spiritual leader until his death in 1938.

Rabbi Mendy Chitrik, chairman of Alliance of Rabbis in Islamic States, has served as the rabbi of the Ashkenazi Synagogue since 2003..

See also
History of the Jews in Turkey
List of synagogues in Turkey

References and notes

External links

Chief Rabbinate of Turkey
Shalom Newspaper - The main Jewish newspaper in Turkey

Ashkenazi Jewish culture in Turkey
Ashkenazi synagogues
Austrian diaspora
Synagogues in Istanbul
Synagogues completed in 1900
Beyoğlu
Synagogues in the Ottoman Empire
Synagogue buildings with domes
20th-century religious buildings and structures in Turkey